The Moldovan Border Police also commonly known as the Moldovan Frontier Police is the official paramilitary border guard of the Republic of Moldova. It is currently a department of the Ministry of Internal Affairs (MAI) and exercises its powers and policy in the accordance with the ministry. It was originally founded as the Border Guard Troops, and later the Border Guard Service of the Armed Forces of the Republic of Moldova.

It would remain a military branch until a 2012 government reform, putting it under the control of the MAI. The Day of the Border Police is celebrated annually on 10 June.

History
Following the fall of the Soviet Union, the newly elected first President of Moldova, Mircea Snegur founded the border police on September 3, 1991. The administration of the border troops was entrusted to the  Ministry of National Security of Moldova under the subordination of the entire subunit of the former Soviet Border Troops deployed on Moldovan territory. On January 11, 1992, Colonel Vasile Calmoi was appointed as the first commander of the boarder troops.

In accordance with a government decree which was signed on June 15, 1992, the Moldovan Border Troops became an official separate branch of the armed forces, with the law "On the State Border of the Republic of Moldova", coming into force by November 1994. Border guards day was first celebrated in Moldova on May 27, 1995 as the professional holiday of the Border Guard Troops of Moldova, before later being celebrated annually on June 10, which marks the day that President Snegur handed the flag of the border troops to promoted Brigader General Calmoi. In December 1999, the Moldovan Border Guard was reorganized into the Department of the Border Guard Troops of the Republic of Moldova and was withdrawn from the Ministry of National Security a month and a half later.

On December 1, 2005 the European Union Border Assistance Mission to the Republic of Moldova and Ukraine (EUBAM) was launched and on July 13, 2006, the EUBAM Territorial Office in Moldova and Ukraine was opened by the Border Guard Service. On January 10, 2007, the border service established the National Border Police College in Chisinau.

On July 1, 2012, the Prime Minister Vlad Filat signed a law, which would shift the border service from the armed forces to the internal affairs ministry.

Responsibilities
In the field of border management, the border police's main purpose is to fight against illegal migration and cross-border crime. In order to fulfill these tasks, the border police finds and examines the contraventions, undertakes the judicial expertise of the documents, performs special investigative measures. The border police performs these duties within the boundaries of the Moldovan borders with Ukraine, and Romania.

The basic principles of which the border police follows include: legality, impartiality, respect for human rights, transparency, personal responsibility, and professionalism. The MAI exercises control and coordinates the activity of the border police as well as elaborates and promotes the state policy of the service. It has signed many agreements with the Romanian Border Police and the State Border Guard Service of Ukraine for joint cooperation in the policing of their borders as well as the Transnistrian-Moldovan border.

Organization
The official structure of the Moldovan Border Police

Organizational structure of the Border Police Department 
 Leadership
 General Border Control Directorate
 General Operations Management Division
 Human Resources General Directorate
 Prosecution Department
 Special Investigation Division
 Legal and contraventional practice
 Risk Analysis Division
 Documentation Directorate
 Inspection Directorate
 Policy and Assistance Directorate
 Directorate for International Cooperation
 Logistics and procurement 
 Management Department
 Department of Economics and Finance
 Secretariat (with management status)
 Internal audit department
 Public relations department

Subdivisions subordinated to the Border Police Department 
 North Regional Directorate
 West Regional Direction
 South Regional Directorate
 East Regional Directorate
 Center Regional Directorate
 Border Police Sector Chisinau International Airport
 Police Band
 Center of Excellence in Border Security

List of General Directors
 Brigadier general Vasile Calmoi (January 11, 1992 – June 6, 2001)
 Brigadier general Igor Colenov (June 6, 2001 – December 17, 2009)
 Brigadier general Alexei Roibu (December 17, 2009 – April 8, 2011)
 Roman Revenco (April 8, 2011 – August 29, 2012)
 Dorin Purice (August 29, 2012)
 Fredolin Lecari (since September 28, 2016)

References

External links
 Official Website

Border guards
Government paramilitary forces
Military of Moldova
Law enforcement in Moldova
Military units and formations established in 1991